The 2012 MLS Supplemental Draft was a secondary draft that was held by Major League Soccer via conference call on January 17, 2012.  The draft was four rounds and all 19 MLS clubs participated.

Changes from 2011 
As an expansion club, Montreal received the first pick in the Supplemental Draft.
Due to the league shortening the 2012 MLS SuperDraft from three rounds to two rounds, the Supplemental Draft was increased from three rounds to four rounds. Previously traded SuperDraft Round 3 picks became Supplemental Draft Round 1 picks.

Selection Order 
The official selection order was set by Major League Soccer on October 21, 2011:

2012 expansion team Montreal Impact had the first selection;
The eight clubs which did not qualify for the playoffs received picks #2 through #9 (in reverse order of season points);
The two clubs eliminated in the Wild Card round of playoffs received picks #10 and #11 (in reverse order of season points);
The four clubs eliminated in the Conference Semifinals received picks #12 through #15 (in reverse order of season points);
The two clubs eliminated in the Conference Finals received picks #16 and #17 (in reverse order of season points);
The club which lost the 2011 MLS Cup received pick #18;
The club which won the 2011 MLS Cup received pick #19.

This selection order held for all four rounds of the Supplemental Draft.

Round 1

Round 1 Trades

Round 2

Round 2 Trades

Round 3

Round 3 Trades

Round 4

Round 4 Trades

Note on SuperDraft Trades 
MLS reduced the 2012 MLS SuperDraft from three rounds to two rounds on October 21, 2011, which in turn affected trades involving 2012 SuperDraft Round 3 and Round 4 selections. These selections became 2012 Supplemental Draft Round 1 and Round 2 selections.

References 

Major League Soccer drafts
Mls Supplemental Draft, 2012
MLS Supplemental Draft